CSLP can stand for:

 Center for Short-Lived Phenomena 
 Canada Student Loans
 Craik Sustainable Living Project
 Collaborative Summer Library Program